John Bennie (30 November 1896 – after 1921) was a Scottish professional footballer who played as a centre forward. In the 1921–22 season, he played 12 league games and scored six goals for Nelson in the Football League Third Division North.

References
 
 

Scottish footballers
1896 births
Year of death unknown
Association football forwards
Falkirk F.C. players
Nelson F.C. players
English Football League players
Scottish Football League players
People from Polmont
Bo'ness F.C. players
Footballers from Falkirk (council area)